The possible hybrid cultivar Ulmus 'Kansas Hybrid' was raised by the Kansas Nursery Co., Salina, Kansas in the 1920s from a seedling exhibiting hybrid characteristics, and maintained by grafting. The inclusion of the word "hybrid" is considered to render the cultivar name invalid.

Description
The tree was described as having an upright branching habit, and dark, shiny leaves the same size as U. americana.

Pests and diseases
'Kansas Hybrid' had not (by 1995) been widely tested for resistance to Dutch elm disease.

Cultivation
Fast growing, 'KH' was also reputed to be cold and drought resistant.  The tree is not known to have been introduced to Europe or Australasia.

Accessions
North America
Arnold Arboretum, US. Acc. no. 362–63, no provenance data available.

References

Elm cultivars
Ulmus articles missing images
Ulmus